The Jinhua dialect is a dialect of Wu Chinese spoken in the city of Jinhua, China and the surrounding region in central Zhejiang province.

In the Jinhua dialect, the name "" is underlyingly  and is pronounced .

References

Wu Chinese